Ellerman Lines was a UK cargo and passenger shipping company that operated from the late nineteenth century and into the twentieth century. It was founded in the late 19th century, and continued to expand by acquiring smaller shipping lines until it became one of the largest shipping firms in the World. Setbacks occurred through heavy losses to its merchant fleet in the First and Second World Wars but were overcome in each case.

The company suffered from competition and modernising trends in the shipping industry that occurred in the second half of the 20th century. Its shipping assets were subsequently sold off to larger companies until the name was dropped in 2004, and Ellerman finally ceased its long association with shipping. However, as of 2021, the Ellerman name was revived in the form of Ellerman City Liners, to provide a new container shipping service between the UK and China.

History

Predecessors and early years

The company was incorporated in 1892, by the businessmen John Ellerman, Christopher Furness and Henry O'Hagan, who bought the assets of the Liverpool based shipping firm Frederick Leyland and Co Ltd. The company started with an initial capital of £800,000 to buy the fleet of 22 vessels from the executors of Frederick Leyland, the former head of Frederick Leyland and Co. Ellerman was initially the managing director, and Furness the chairman, but Ellerman had taken on the role of chairman himself by 1893.

The company expanded in 1900 by acquiring 20 ships from the West India and Pacific Steamship Company. The firm was then reorganised as Frederick Leyland (1900), and operated with a capital of £2,800,000. In 1901 the company was bought by J. P. Morgan's International Marine Mercantile Company, but Ellerman remained as chairman, and the owner of 20 ships. He later acquired the Papayanni Steamship Company and eight of its ships. He used these assets to form the London, Liverpool and Ocean Shipping Company, based at Moorgate in London.

The London, Liverpool and Ocean Shipping Company then went on to buy 50 percent of George Smith and Sons' City Line, Glasgow, and 50 percent of the Hall Line Ltd in 1903. Its capital was further increased, and the name was changed to Ellerman Lines. The company had its head offices in Liverpool and Glasgow, with a subsidiary office in London. Further acquisitions followed. In 1904–05 the company bought McGregor, Gow and Co of Liverpool, which was known as Glen Line. In 1908 the company bought the financially troubled Bucknall Steamship Lines who operated on numerous routes between the United Kingdom, South Africa, the near East and North America, which in 1914 was renamed Ellerman & Bucknall Steamship Co.

The Ellerman group of companies now occupied a dominating position in the Mediterranean and Near East. By 1914, the Ellerman group controlled four subsidiary companies: Ellerman City Line; Ellerman and Bucknall Steamship Company; Ellerman and Papayanni Lines; and Hall Line (though the City and Hall line were often referred to as one — Ellerman City & Hall Lines).

Wartime service and purchase of Wilson Line
Ellerman's position as a major shipping firm meant that a large portion of its fleet was requisitioned by the British Government on the outbreak of the First World War, for use as troop ships, munitions carriers, or for conversion into armed merchant cruisers to augment the Royal Navy. Ellerman continued to operate a skeletal service with its remaining ships, and in 1916 Ellerman personally bought Wilson Line of Hull, bringing 67 short-sea vessels into service with the company.

The Wilson operation was renamed Ellerman's Wilson Line and traded as a separate entity with its own distinctive livery of red funnel with a black top and most of the vessels had dark green hulls. This was a complete contrast to the buff funnels with a black top and white dividing line used by the grey hulled Ellerman Lines' vessels.

"Heavy losses were suffered by the various companies controlled by Sir John Ellerman. In all, 103 ocean vessels, with a total cargo capacity of 600,000 to 750,000 tons, were destroyed. These included the liner City of Athens mined off Cape Town in Aug. 1917. City of Winchester (1914) was the first merchant vessel to be destroyed in the war, being captured by the German cruiser , while homeward bound from India with a very valuable cargo of produce. Another liner belonging to the Ellerman fleets was mined far from Europe. The City of Exeter, a fine passenger ship, struck a mine in the Indian Ocean, about 400 m. from Bombay. Number 1 hold filled at once, and the master gave orders for the passengers and crew to leave the ship. Then the master and chief engineer returned and, at grave risk, made a thorough examination of the ship. They decided that, with the exercise of the greatest care, the crippled vessel could reach Bombay under her own steam. The passengers reembarked and the vessel safely arrived in port."

Ellerman Lines sought to restore a pre-war level of service after the end of the war. This involved obtaining several German liners as well as placing orders for new ships. Before long the old networks of passenger and cargo services had been restored. John Ellerman died a baronet with a fortune of £37 million in 1933.

By 1939 and the outbreak of the Second World War the fleet had been successfully rebuilt and expanded, to the extent that the Ellerman groups owned a total 105 ships with a combined capacity of 920,000 tons. This made Ellerman's one of the biggest fleets in the World. Its ships were in four classes: mixed cargo and passenger ships; cargo ships with limited passenger accommodation; pure cargo ships; and short sea traders for service in the Mediterranean. Many of these ships were subsequently requisition by the UK Government, whilst others were kept as cargo vessels to transport supplies to the United Kingdom.

In total, the Ellerman Group lost 60 ships out of its fleet of 105.

Post war recovery

As with the period after the losses of the First World War, a new building programme was undertaken. A new policy meant the building of fast steam cargo liners that carried no more than a dozen passengers in considerable comfort. Crew accommodation was likewise improved. The focus was on re-building their international trade routes and to this end they purchased outright 12 cargo ships from the Government which they had managed in the war. By 1952, 25 of these new style 12-passenger ships had entered service, making for a total of 45 new vessels since the war, and with a further 14 for use on the Portuguese trade routes and Mediterranean services. By 1953 Ellerman's fleet had been almost completely rebuilt, consisting of a total of 94 ships with a carrying capacity of 900,000 tons.

In 1967, as containerisation began to rationalise the World's shipping services, Ellerman Lines (excluding the Wilson operation) controlled 59 oceangoing vessels.

Eventual decline

Trading was however becoming more difficult with newly independent nations, such as India, setting up their own shipping companies. The nature of shipping was also changing, with the advent of containerisation. In 1966 Ellerman Lines joined the Associated Container Transportation (ACT) Group consortium and started the successful containerisation of its Mediterranean services. By the early 1970s the Ellerman group had expanded its commercial interests into other areas, including hotels, brewing and printing. In 1973 it merged all its shipping companies into one division.

Ten years later its profitability had plummeted and it was making heavy losses. The whole business was then sold to the Barclay brothers. In 1985 the shipping business was bought by its management, then sold to the Trafalgar House conglomerate, which merged it with its ownership of the Cunard Line to form Cunard-Ellerman in 1987. In 1991 they passed it to the Andrew Weir Shipping Group, who sold it to Hamburg Süd in 2003. In 2004 the name was dropped and Ellerman Lines ceased to exist.

Revival

Ellerman City Liners, a subsidiary of UniOcean Lines, was relaunched in 2021, bringing the Ellerman name back into commercial use for the first time since 2004. The company now operates container shipping services between the UK and China.

Ships of the Ellerman Lines

Legacy 
Several port cities have streets named after John Ellerman, for example Amsterdam and Antwerp.

References

Notes

Bibliography

External links

 

Defunct shipping companies of the United Kingdom
David and Frederick Barclay
Transport companies established in 1892
1892 establishments in England